Anna Melato (born 18 May 1952 in Milan) is an Italian actress, singer and voice actor. She sang Nino Rota's Canzone arrabbiata and El Tunin. 
She is the sister of Mariangela Melato. She currently resides in Rome.

Filmography 
 Love and Anarchy (1973)
 Casotto (1977)
 Due pezzi di pane (1979)
 Il matrimonio di Caterina film TV (1982)
 Eccezzziunale... veramente (1982)
 Dancing Paradise (1982)
 Aiutami a sognare (1982)
 Chi mi aiuta...? (1983)
 Chewingum (1984)
 Caccia al ladro d'autore serie TV (1985)
 Una donna a Venezia sceneggiato TV (1986)
 Il commissario Corso serie TV (1987)
 Quelli del casco (1987)
 Fuga senza fine (1987)
 Ma non-per sempre (1991)
 Bidoni (1995)
 Infiltrato (1996)
 La mia generazione (1996)
 Grazie di tutto (1998)
 Fine secolo serie TV (1999)
 Senza filtro (2001)
 Incantesimo serie TV (2002)
 Amanti e segreti serie TV (2004)
 La stagione dei delitti serie TV (2004–2007)
 La dama velata serie TV (2015)

Discography

45 rounds 
 1973 Canzone arrabbiata/Antonio Soffiantini detto Tunin (Cinevox)
 1973 Punto d'incontro/La notte fu (Ricordi)
 1973 Dormitorio pubblico/Punto d'incontro (Ricordi)
 1974 Sta piovendo dolcemente (Festival di Sanremo)/Faccia di pietra (Ricordi)
 1974 Vola/Madame Marilou (Ricordi)
 1975 Comunque sia/La mia pelle in libertà (Ricordi)
 1977 Ritratto/Io so come si fa (RCA Italiana)
 1980 Voglio fare l'ospite/Uan tu tri (Ricordi)
 1983 Poco e malefficiente/Dove credi di andare (Soedi)
 1985 Sto da sola/Rudy rap (Cam)

33 rounds 
 1974 Domenica mattina (Ricordi)
 1977 Ritratto (RCA Italiana)
 1979 L'ingorgo (dalla colonna sonora del film omonimo interpreta Una storia impossible)(Cam)
 1982 Dancing Paradise'' (dalla colonna sonora del film omonimo) (Centotrè)

External links
 

1952 births
Italian voice actresses
Living people
Actresses from Milan